Betty White (January 17, 1922 - December 31, 2021) was an American actress and comedian known for her roles on television. White worked longer in the television industry than anyone else and earned herself a Guinness World Record in 2013, having it renewed in 2018.

Her roles on television including Sue Ann Nivens on the CBS sitcom The Mary Tyler Moore Show (1973–1977), Rose Nylund on the NBC sitcom The Golden Girls (1985–1992), and Elka Ostrovsky on the TV Land sitcom Hot in Cleveland (2010–2015). She gained renewed popularity after her appearance in the romantic comedy film The Proposal (2009) with Sandra Bullock and Ryan Reynolds, and went on to host Saturday Night Live in 2010 gaining her a Primetime Emmy Award for Outstanding Guest Actress in a Comedy Series. She had also been a staple on many game shows since the mid-1950s.

White died on December 31, 2021, seventeen days before her 100th birthday, which was due to be celebrated in a televised special on January 17, 2022. It contained an interview from White, filmed just ten days prior to her death. The decision was made to continue with the televised celebration posthumously, thus ending White's record-breaking, 83-year career on television in 2022.

Film

Television

References

White, Betty
White, Betty
Filmography